Three-Ring Marriage also known as 3-Ring Marriage is a lost 1928 American silent drama film directed by Marshall Neilan and starring Mary Astor, Lloyd Hughes, and Lawford Davidson.

Cast
 Mary Astor as Anna  
 Lloyd Hughes as Cal 
 Lawford Davidson as Souvane  
 Yola d'Avril as Minnie  
 Alice White as Trapeze Performer  
 Harry Earles as Cubby Snodd 
 Tiny Doll as Mrs. Cubby Snodd  
 George Reed as  Valet  
 R.E. 'Tex' Madsen as Giant  
 Anna Magruder as Fat Woman  
 James Neill as Hutch  
 Dell Henderson as Gangster  
 Rudolph Cameron as Gangster  
 Richard 'Skeets' Gallagher as Gangster 
 Jay Eaton as Gangster  
 Art Rowlands as Gangster  
 Howard Truesdale
 Daisy Earles as Minor Role  
 George Y. Harvey as Detective

References

Bibliography
 Lowe, Denise. An Encyclopedic Dictionary of Women in Early American Films: 1895-1930. Routledge, 2014.

External links

1928 films
American romantic drama films
Films directed by Marshall Neilan
American silent feature films
1920s English-language films
First National Pictures films
American black-and-white films
Lost drama films
Lost American films
1928 lost films
1928 romantic drama films
1920s American films
Silent romantic drama films
Silent American drama films